Iain Evans (born May 29, 1981, in Johannesburg, Gauteng) is a male field hockey player from South Africa, who was a member of the national squad that finished tenth at the 2004 Summer Olympics in Athens.

International Senior Tournaments
 2003 – Champions Challenge, Johannesburg (3rd)
 2004 – Olympic Qualifier, Madrid (7th)
 2004 – Summer Olympics, Athens (10th)

References

External links

1981 births
Living people
South African male field hockey players
Olympic field hockey players of South Africa
Field hockey players at the 2004 Summer Olympics
Field hockey players from Johannesburg